Selawik Lake (Inupiaq: Imaġruk) is a lake located  southwest of Selawik, Alaska. It is adjacent to the Selawik National Wildlife Refuge and the Baldwin Peninsula, feeding into the Hotham Inlet and Kotzebue Sound.

Selawik Lake is the third largest lake in Alaska after Iliamna Lake and Becharof Lake, and seventeenth largest lake in the United States of America.

History
Its Eskimo language name was first reported in 1842–44 by Lt. Lavrenty Zagoskin, IRN, who spelled it Chilivik, and probably meant to apply to an Eskimo tribe or village.  It appears to have been by one of the Sir John Franklin search expeditions about 1850.

References

Lakes of Alaska
Bodies of water of Northwest Arctic Borough, Alaska